The Château Narbonnais was a castle of the Counts of Toulouse on the west side of the city Toulouse. The castle featured prominently in the Cathar wars.

History
In May 1215 the City of Toulouse surrendered to Simon de Montfort but in September or October 1216 a popular uprising in the City against the occupying forces, forced Simon to leave. On 12 September 1217 Raymond VI of Toulouse re-entered the City, trapping Simon de Montfort's wife family in the Château.

From 13 September 1217 to 22 July 1218, Simon de Montfort besieges the castle again, without success and on 25 June 1218, he was hit on the head by a stone from a trebuchet, and died.

From 16 June to 1 August 1219 Louis IX laid siege to the castle, again without success. The castle was dismantled in 1549.

Description
The castle was dismantled, but depiction of it remains on the Municipal Seal of Toulouse  which shows a crenellated castle with three towers

References

Châteaux in Haute-Garonne